Rocks is the fourth studio album by American rock band Aerosmith, released on 3 May 1976. AllMusic described Rocks as having "captured Aerosmith at their most raw and rocking." Rocks was ranked number 366 on the updated Rolling Stones list of the 500 Greatest Albums of All Time in 2020. It has greatly influenced many hard rock and heavy metal artists, including Guns N' Roses, Metallica, and Nirvana. The album was a commercial success, charting three singles on the Billboard Hot 100, two of which reached the Top 40 ("Back in the Saddle" and "Last Child"). The album was one of the first to ship platinum when it was released, and has since gone quadruple platinum.

Background
Previously, Aerosmith had recorded three albums: Aerosmith (1973), Get Your Wings (1974), and the breakthrough LP Toys in the Attic (1975), which produced Top Ten hit "Walk This Way" and the popular "Sweet Emotion". Although often derided by critics, the band had amassed a loyal fanbase from relentless touring and their ferocious live shows. They also began living the rock-and-roll lifestyle to the hilt, indulging their already considerable appetite for drugs. However, their hedonistic lifestyle did not appear to hamper them creatively; Rocks was considered by many fans, critics, and fellow musicians to be one of the highlights of their career. Guitarist Joe Perry later recalled, "There's no doubt we were doing a lot of drugs by then, but whatever we were doing, it was still working for us."

Recording and composition
In the 1997 band memoir Walk This Way, guitarist Brad Whitford states that the band began work on the album by backing the Record Plant's mobile recording truck into their rehearsal space, named the Wherehouse, and "let fly... We were living the high life and not paying attention to anything except making this record. I had the beginnings of 'Last Child' and 'Nobody's Fault.' Tom [Hamilton, bassist] had 'Uncle Tom's Cabin' that became 'Sick as a Dog.' We had 'Tit for Tat'... which turned into 'Rats in the Cellar.' We cut all the basic tracks except two there." Producer Jack Douglas later insisted:

The album's opening track, "Back in the Saddle", recalls the Gene Autry song "Back in the Saddle Again" (vocalist Steven Tyler yodels on the fade) and features the sound of a whip by whirling a thirty-foot cord in the middle of six Neumann mikes and adding a cap gun for the cracking sound effect. A real bullwhip was intended to be used for the whip effects and hours were spent trying to get it to crack. The band members ended up cut up and hurt without making any progress. The first verse features the sound of clinking spurs, which was actually produced using bells and tambourines strapped to Tyler's cowboy boots by Perry and New York Dolls singer David Johansen. The song is also notable for the slow buildup of the drum beat and guitar riff in the beginning of the song, as well as the sound effects of a galloping horse. In 1997, Perry explained to Alan di Perna of Guitar World that he was inspired by Peter Green to write the riff on a Fender Bass VI and admitted that he was "very high on heroin when I wrote 'Back in the Saddle.' That riff just floated right through me." Brad Whitford plays the lead guitar part. "Back in the Saddle" also features one of the heaviest and noticeable bass lines by Tom Hamilton. When the song is performed in concert, Steven Tyler often makes more noticeable lyrical and visible references to sex. Although the lyrics, composed by Tyler, were written with the simple idea of cowboys and sex, this song took on new meaning after Aerosmith reunited in 1984 and embarked on their Back in the Saddle tour. Today, the song remains a staple on classic rock radio and in concert. It is arguably one of the heaviest songs of Aerosmith's Top 40 singles, and is cited by rock musicians Slash and James Hetfield as among their favorite rock songs. Hamilton, who had written "Sweet Emotion" with Tyler, collaborated with the singer again on "Sick as a Dog." In 1997 the bassist explained to Guitar World, "I think I came up with the verse part first. And then I did the parts for the intro, the B to E part, and then came up with this little, jangling arpeggio thing... I'm such a Byrds fan; it comes from that." In the same interview Perry added:

In his memoir, Tyler stated that he wrote "Rats in the Cellar" as a "tip of the hat, or an answer to 'Toys in the Attic'... Meanwhile, in real life, 'Rats' was more like what was actually going on. Things were coming apart, sanity was scurrying south, caution was flung to the winds, and little by little the chaos was permanently moving in." Although it was never a popular Aerosmith number, "Nobody's Fault" remains a favorite of the band's, with Tyler calling it "one of the highlights of my creative career" and Kramer insisting "it's some of the best drumming I did." Tyler claims the lyrics have to do with the band's fear of earthquakes and flying, while "Lick and a Promise" is about the band's determination to deliver a rocking live show. "Combination" features Perry sharing lead vocal duties with Tyler for the first time, and the guitarist admitted in 1997 that the song was "about heroin, cocaine, and me". In his memoir, Tyler calls the line "Walkin' on Gucci wearing Yves St. Laurent/Barely stay on 'cause I'm so goddamn gaunt" the best lyric Perry ever wrote: "It was the truth, it was clever, and it described us to a tee". Regarding his vocal on the song, Perry later commented, "This was touchy because singing was Steven's jealously guarded territory... Beyond that, anytime the spotlight shone on me I detected a bit of jealousy from the other guys. After a while, though, the band came around and supported me, as long as I sang the song as a semi-duet with Steven." "Home Tonight" features Tyler on piano, Perry on a lap steel guitar as a lead guitar and his Les Paul for the rhythm guitar, and has drummer Joey Kramer, Tom Hamilton, and producer/arranger Jack Douglas performing backing vocals. Of the song Perry recalled, "Steven could always be counted on to come up with some little piano riff that would be our ballad for the record. And that was it."

Reception and legacy

Contemporary reviews were mixed. John Milward of Rolling Stone wrote that "the material is Rocks’ major flaw, mostly pale remakes of their earlier hits"; concluding that the return to the "ear-boxing sound" of Get Your Wings and Tyler's vocal performance cannot save the album from mediocrity. In The Village Voice, Robert Christgau wrote that Aerosmith were doing a good job of imitating Led Zeppelin, and that after this album the band began to lose steam.

Modern reviews are very positive. Greg Prato of AllMusic describes Rocks as "a superb follow-up to their masterwork Toys in the Attic" that captures "Aerosmith at their most raw and rocking". He writes that "Back in the Saddle" and "Last Child" are among their most renowned songs, but all the "tracks prove essential to the makeup of the album". Ben Mitchell of Blender said that the members' drug use actually helped Rocks. He also called the album "raw." In a November 1994 Los Angeles Times review of Rocks, Jon Matsumoto opined that the record "arguably is the best heavy metal opus ever concocted". Canadian journalist Martin Popoff described the album as "a screamin' mercury-shattering rock festival, live, overblown, decadent, and very American", concluding that "on Rocks the band's talent is anything but wasted."

Many musicians have cited Rocks as a favorite:
 Rocks was one of Kurt Cobain's favorite albums, as he listed in his Journals.
 In 2003, the album was ranked number 176 on Rolling Stone magazine's list of The 500 Greatest Albums of All Time, maintaining the rating in a 2012 revised list, before it was dropped to 366 in a 2020 revised list.
 Mötley Crüe songwriter and bassist Nikki Sixx refers to Aerosmith frequently in his book The Heroin Diaries.
Metallica leader James Hetfield has identified Rocks, as well as Aerosmith, as important influences in his music, stating that the band was the reason why he wanted to learn guitar.
 Slash says Rocks was the album that inspired him to learn guitar, and that the album changed his life:

In his autobiography Rocks, Joe Perry states the driving purpose of Rocks "was to reidentify us as America's ultimate garage band, with blistering guitars, blistering vocals, balls-to-the-wall smash-your-eardrums production... The cover showed five diamonds, one for each of us. We saw that record as a jewel, the culmination of all our angst and anger and excitement and joy as go-for-broke rock and rollers."

Track listing

Personnel
Adapted from the liner notes.  Track numbers refer to CD and digital releases of the album.

Aerosmith
 Steven Tylerlead vocals, keyboards, harmonica, bass guitar on "Sick as a Dog"
 Joe Perrylead guitar on track 3,4,7,8; six-string bass on "Back in the Saddle", bass guitar on "Sick as a Dog", pedal steel guitar on "Home Tonight", percussion and outro solo on "Sick as a Dog", backing vocals, harmony vocal on "Combination"
 Brad Whitfordlead guitars on track 1,2,5,6,9 and rhythm guitar (3,4,7,8)
 Tom Hamiltonbass guitar, rhythm guitar on "Sick as a Dog"
 Joey Kramerdrums, percussion, backing vocals on "Home Tonight"

Additional musician
 Paul Prestopinobanjo on "Last Child"

Production
 Jack Douglas – producer, arrangements with Aerosmith, backing vocals on "Home Tonight"
 Jay Messina – engineer
 David Hewitt – remote truck director
 Rod O'Brien – assistant engineer
 Sam Ginsburg – assistant engineer
 David Krebs & Steve Leber (for Leber-Krebs, Inc.) – management
 Pacific Eye & Ear – album design

Charts

Certifications

References

Bibliography

External links
 

Aerosmith albums
1976 albums
Albums produced by Jack Douglas (record producer)
Albums recorded at Record Plant (New York City)
Columbia Records albums